Brian Turner (born 18 June 1930) is a former Australian rules footballer who played with Richmond in the Victorian Football League (VFL).

He later played for Box Hill Football Club in the Victorian Football Association and in 1954 was appointed captain coach of Bairnsdale Football Club, but Box Hill refused to issue him a clearance.

Notes

External links 

Living people
1930 births
Australian rules footballers from Victoria (Australia)
Richmond Football Club players
Box Hill Football Club players